Dmitry Mikhaylovich Aydov (born 10 April 1982) is a Russian former professional association football player.

Career
On 30 June 2015, Aydov left FC Anzhi Makhachkala, and signed a one-year contract with FC Arsenal Tula.

In November 2016, Aydov was accused of using racist language towards Amkar Perm players Sékou Condé and Fegor Ogude.

In November 2020, he was banned from any football activity by FIFA due to match fixing in the Belarusian Premier League.

References

External links
 
 

1982 births
Sportspeople from Nizhny Novgorod
Living people
Russian footballers
Russian expatriate footballers
Expatriate footballers in Belarus
Association football defenders
FC Volga Nizhny Novgorod players
FC Nizhny Novgorod (2007) players
Russian Premier League players
FC Torpedo Moscow players
FC Anzhi Makhachkala players
FC Arsenal Tula players
FC Gomel players